Bandish is a fixed, melodic composition in Hindustani vocal or instrumental music.

Bandish may also refer to:
 Bandish (1955 film), a black and white Indian Hindi-language film
 Bandish (1980 Indian film), a Hindi-language film directed by K. Bapaiah
 Bandish (1980 Pakistani film), a Pakistani film
 Bandish (1996 film), an Indian Hindi-language film directed by Prakash Jha
 Bandish (TV series), a 2019 Pakistani supernatural horror drama series